Songket Minangkabau is a traditional songket woven cloth originating from West Sumatra, Indonesia. Songket has become a cultural identity in the Minangkabau tradition. Songket is closely related to the Minangkabau community because it has been widely used as a material for traditional clothing and other traditional core crafts. There are various types of Minangkabau songket motifs and philosophies, each motif passed down from generation to generation for use in the Pepatih custom.

The history of the Songket Minangkabau itself comes from the Srivijaya which was then developed through the Sumatran kingdom until it finally entered the Minang realm. Songket was created as a means of expression because the Minang people in ancient times could not write and finally they also expressed their feelings into songket so that each songket has a different meaning.

As a characteristic of cloth in Minangkabau, the famous songket cloth in West Sumatra is Songket Pandai Sikek and Songket Silungkang. The names of the two songkets are taken from the name of the place where this songket comes from, namely Pandai Sikek in Tanah Datar and Silungkang in Sawahlunto.

Songket Minangkabau is a unique traditional art form. This weaving art is quite complicated and requires precision and perseverance in the weaving process. In addition, the ornaments or motifs of Minangkabau songket are not just decorations or ornaments. Minangkabau songket motifs or decorations each have a name and meaning, namely about the journey of Minangkabau culture and society. Songket Minangkabau motifs are displayed in the form of natural symbols, especially plants, which are rich in explicit and implied meanings. Songket motifs are often named after plants, animals or objects in the natural environment. For example, Bungo Malur, Kudo-Kudo,Balapak Gadang, Ranggo Patai Pucuak,Pucuak,Pucuak kelapa, and many more. The decorative motifs on the edge of the songket cloth are also named, such as Bungo Tanjung, Lintahu Ayahah, Bareh Diatua, Ula Gerang , and others. Like the motifs of Batik which are full of meaning, the Silungkang songket motifs are also studded with philosophy.

The motif of Kaluak Paku (the curve of a young fern shoot) means "Before correcting others, we should look inside ourselves first". While the Ilalang Rabah motif (falling down) means "Vigilance, prudence and accuracy of a leader are the main things".

The most popular and sacred motif for the Minangkabau community is the Pucuk Rebung  motif or in the local language called Pucuak Rabuang  symbolizing a useful life throughout. It all appears in the evolution of bamboo shoots (Bambu muda) to aging which reflects the process of human life towards a useful person.

See also

 Songket
 Tenun
 Culture of Indonesia

References

Figured fabrics
History of Asian clothing
Indonesian clothing
National symbols of Indonesia
Supplementary weave